Jigsaw is an Australian television series which aired 1965 on the Australian Television Network, which later became the Seven Network. Hosted by Billy Raymond, it was a daytime game show aired in a 30-minute time-slot. (Running time excluding commercials is not known. Though a prime-time series of the era could run 24–25 minutes, daytime series tended to run shorter). The series was produced in Sydney. It ran for 24 weeks.

References

External links
 

Seven Network original programming
1965 Australian television series debuts
1965 Australian television series endings
1960s Australian game shows
Black-and-white Australian television shows
English-language television shows